Never Cry Wolf is a 1983 American drama film directed by Carroll Ballard. The film is an adaptation of Farley Mowat's 1963 autobiography of the same name and stars Charles Martin Smith as a government biologist sent into the wilderness to study the caribou population, whose decline is believed to be caused by wolves, even though no one has seen a wolf kill a caribou. The film also features Brian Dennehy and Zachary Ittimangnaq. It was the first Disney film to be released under the new Walt Disney Pictures label. The film was released on October 7, 1983, for a limited distribution, and in the regular theaters on January 27, 1984.

The film is also notable for being the first Walt Disney Pictures film to feature brief full-frontal male nudity, as well as scenes with bare buttocks.

The narration for the film was written by Charles Martin Smith, Eugene Corr and Christina Luescher.

Plot 
The young, naïve Canadian biologist Tyler is assigned by the government to travel to the isolated Canadian Arctic wilderness and study why the area's caribou population is declining, believed to be due to wolf-pack attacks; amongst his orders to study them, he is also given a gun and required to kill one wolf and examine its stomach contents. Tyler receives a baptism of fire into bush life with a trip by bush plane piloted by "Rosie" Little. After landing at the destination, Rosie leaves Tyler in the middle of a sub-zero frozen Arctic lake. Tyler is at a loss of what to do about his situation until he is rescued by a traveling Inuit named Ootek, who transports him and his gear off the ice and builds a shelter for him.

Alone, Tyler divides his days between research and survival, while nights are fraught with nightmares of wolf attacks upon him. He soon encounters two wolves—which he names George and Angeline, who have pups, and discovers they seem as curious of him as he is of them. He and the wolves begin social exchanges, even urine-marking their territories, producing trust and respect between them. Noticing that they have not eaten any caribou and only mice, he begins a side experiment of eating only mice for protein sustenance.

Another Inuit named Mike encounters Tyler, sent by Ootek for companionship. Mike knows English and Inuit, translating between Ootek and Tyler. Ootek, the elder, is content and curious about Tyler, while the younger Mike seems not only more reserved but unhappy with the Inuit way of life, confessing to Tyler his social apprehensions, this is mainly due to the fact that Mike is missing nearly all his teeth as well as telling Tyler about the time he met a girl and how she was comfortable with him until he smiled. Tyler discovers that Mike is a wolf hunter, killing for pelts to sell to make a living. Tyler demonstrates a trick he has learned: by playing certain notes on his bassoon, he can imitate a wolf howl, calling other wolves in.

Autumn nears, and Tyler hears that the caribou are migrating south, which will provide an opportunity for him to study the concept his superiors want to confirm. Ootek takes Tyler on a three-day hike to where the caribou will be. The caribou show up as predicted and Tyler observes the wolves make several unsuccessful attacks. Tyler helps drive caribou towards the pack, which soon takes one down. Tyler takes a bone and samples the marrow, discovering the dead caribou to be diseased. It confirms that the wolves are not ruthless killers but rather their predation kills off only the weaker caribou.

One day, Tyler encounters Rosie with two hunter-guests, making plans to exploit the area's resources. Rosie insists on flying out Tyler, who refuses. Rosie then offers to extract Tyler from his research campsite in three days, the time it will take Tyler to hike back.

Tyler returns to the base to find things very still. He ventures into the wolves' territory and goes into their den, only to find the pups cowering in fear and the two wolves nowhere in sight. Rosie's aircraft approaches outside. Believing that Rosie killed George and Angeline, Tyler shouts at Rosie to leave, then shoots at Rosie's plane, which makes him fly away.

Tyler goes back to his camp to find Mike, whose nervous demeanor causes Tyler to suspect that it was Mike, not Rosie, who killed the two wolves. Mike confirms Tyler's suspicions by smiling with a full set of new dentures and leaves, hiking for home.

Some time later, as the first snow begins to fall, Tyler plays the wolf call on his bassoon, bringing in other wolves from George and Angeline's pack. He reflects on his time in the wilderness and how he may have helped bring the modern world to this place. The narration implies that Tyler will return to civilization and recover from his experiences here. Ootek has returned, and in the final scene he and Tyler break camp and trek across the fall tundra to the south, enjoying each other's company, along with the words of an Inuit song that Tyler translates:

Cast 
 Charles Martin Smith as Tyler, a biologist without any survival skills, yet bold enough to study wolves in their environment.
 Brian Dennehy as Rosie Little, a carefree bush pilot who exploits the region for money.
 Zachary Ittimangnaq as Ootek, an Inuit who helps Tyler survive the wilderness.
 Samson Jorah as Mike, Ootek's adoptive son, caught between his Inuit ways and the modern world.
 Martha Ittimangnaq as Woman, Ootek's wife.
 Hugh Webster as Drunk
 Tom Dahlgren as Hunter #1
 Walker Stuart as Hunter #2

Production 
The fundamental premise in Never Cry Wolf  is that life in the Arctic seems to be about dying: not only are the caribou and the wolves dying, but the indigenous Inuit and their way of life as well. The animals are losing their habitat and the Inuit are losing their land and their resources while their youth are being seduced by—and pressured into—modernity. They are trading what is real and true, dicing away their time-honoured traditions for the perceived comforts and securities of the modern world.

Never Cry Wolf blends the documentary film style with the narrative elements of drama, resulting in a type of docudrama.  

It was originally written for the screen by Sam Hamm but the screenplay was altered over time and Hamm ended up sharing credit with Curtis Hanson and Richard Kletter.

 
Smith, who had previously worked with Disney on films such as No Deposit, No Return and Herbie Goes Bananas, devoted almost three years to Never Cry Wolf. Smith wrote, "I was much more closely involved in that picture than I had been in any other film. Not only acting, but writing and the whole creative process."  He also found the process difficult.  "During much of the two-year shooting schedule in Canada's Yukon and in Nome, Alaska, I was the only actor present. It was the loneliest film I've ever worked on,"  Smith said.

Filming locations  
The film locations  for Never Cry Wolf included Nome, Alaska, the Yukon Territory, and  Atlin, British Columbia, Canada.

Reception

Critical response  
When Never Cry Wolf was released, a review in the Los Angeles Times called the film, "... subtle, complex and hypnotic ... triumphant filmmaking!"

Brendon Hanley of Allmovie also liked the film, especially Smith's performance, and wrote, "Wolf's protagonist [is] wonderfully played by the reliable character actor Charles Martin Smith... The result is a quirky, deceptively simple meditation on life."

Ronald Holloway, film critic of Variety magazine, gave the film a mostly positive review, and wrote "For the masses out there who love nature films, and even those who don't, Carroll Ballard's more than fits the commercial bill and should score well too with critical suds<sic> on several counts."

Some critics found the premise of Never Cry Wolf a bit hard to believe. Vincent Canby, film critic for The New York Times, wrote, "I find it difficult to accept the fact that the biologist, just after an airplane has left him in the middle of an icy wilderness, in a snowstorm, would promptly get out his typewriter and, wearing woolen gloves, attempt to type up his initial reactions. Canby added, the film was "a perfectly decent if unexceptional screen adaptation of Farley Mowat's best-selling book about the author's life among Arctic wolves."

The review aggregation website Rotten Tomatoes gives the film a score of 100% based on reviews from eighteen critics, with an average rating of 7.7 out of 10.

Awards 
Wins
 Boston Society of Film Critics Awards: 4th BSFC Award; Best Cinematography, Hiro Narita; 1984.
 Hawaii International Film Festival: Excellence in Cinematography Award, Hiro Narita; 1984.
 Motion Picture Sound Editors: Golden Reel Award; Best Sound Editing – Sound Effects; 1984.
 National Society of Film Critics Awards: NSFC Award Best Cinematography, Hiro Narita; 1984.
 Western Heritage Awards: Bronze Wrangler; Theatrical Motion Picture, Carroll Ballard; 1984.

Nominations 
 Academy Awards: Best Sound; Alan Splet, Todd Boekelheide, Randy Thom and David Parker; 1984.

Box office  
The film opened in limited release October 7, 1983 and went into wide circulation January 20, 1984.

The film was in theatres for 192 days (27 weeks) and the total US gross sales were $27,668,764. In its widest release, the film appeared in 540 theatres.

Comparisons to book 
There are several differences in the film when compared to Mowat's book. In the book, Ootek and Mike's roles are reversed, Mike is actually Ootek's older brother (Ootek is a teenager) and Ootek, although speaking mostly in Inuktitut, communicates openly with Mowat while Mike is more reserved.

The film adds a more spiritual element to the story while the book was a straightforward story. The film also isolates the characters while in the book, Mowat meets several people from different areas of the Arctic. Also in the book, the wolves are not killed and neither did the bush pilot bring in investors to build a resort.

Notes

References

Bibliography 

 Mowat, Farley. Never Cry Wolf: Amazing True Story of Life Among Arctic Wolves. New York: Back Bay Books, 2001. .
 Shedd, Warner. Owls Aren't Wise and Bats Aren't Blind: A Naturalist Debunks Our Favorite Fallacies About Wildlife. New York: Broadway Books, 2001, first edition 2000. .

External links 
 
 
 
 
 
 Never Cry Wolf selected scenes from film at YouTube

1983 films
1980s adventure drama films
Adaptations of works by Farley Mowat
American adventure drama films
Biographical films about scientists
Environmental films
Films about wolves
Films based on non-fiction books
Films directed by Carroll Ballard
Films set in Alaska
Films set in British Columbia
Films set in Canada
Films set in Yukon
Films shot in Alaska
Films shot in British Columbia
Films shot in Canada
Films shot in Yukon
Inuktitut-language films
Films with screenplays by Sam Hamm
Walt Disney Pictures films
Films scored by Mark Isham
1983 drama films
1980s English-language films
1980s American films